The  (General directorate for civil defense and crisis management) is a civil defense agency of the French Government. It operates for the Ministry of the Interior and employs some 2,500 civilian and military personnel over 60 sites.

 The , which is in charge of auditing the civil defense public policies.
 The  are the French firefighters.
 The  is the crisis oversight service. It includes the units involved in bomb disposal, coast guard, mountain rescue, air ambulance and medical evacuation, and aerial firefighting duties.
 The  (sub-directorate of international affairs, resources and strategy).

Aircraft 

Aircraft carry the title SECURITE CIVILE on the fuselage sides, together with the international civil defence symbol.

Helicopter group 

The  helicopter group has 23 helicopter bases in mainland France and its overseas territories. It has a fleet of 35 helicopters and employs 230 pilots and flight engineers and 50 ground engineers. Over its 50 years of activity, the helicopter group has an impressive track record, with 480,000 flight hours, 250,000 rescue missions and 225,000 people rescued.

 Eurocopter EC145 (35)

 currently operates 35 EC-145 helicopters that were delivered between 2002 and 2005. The fleet has accumulated over 100,000 flight hours. The EC-145 fleet is used for search and rescue, fire fighting, emergency medical services (EMS), surveillance and law enforcement. EC-145s are deployed on 22  bases in France and the French Overseas Territories. An order has been placed for a further five helicopters, to be delivered from January 2009. This will enable the phasing out of the six remaining Alouette III helicopters. The EC 145 carries out an average 10,000 rescue missions each year, representing over 13,300 flight hours.

Bases 
Helicopter group bases of operation are located at:.

 Ajaccio (Corsica)
 Annecy
 Bastia (Corsica)
 Besançon
 Bordeaux
 Cannes
 Clermont-Ferrand
 Granville
 Grenoble
 Le Havre
 Lille
 Lorient
 Lyon
 Marseille
 Montpellier
 Paris - Issy-les-Moulineaux
 Pau
 Perpignan
 Pointe-à-Pitre (Guadeloupe)
 Quimper
 La Rochelle
 Strasbourg

The  (command centre), and helicopter maintenance base is located in Nîmes.

Helicopters are detached to several other bases seasonally. In summer, aircraft are detached to Courchevel, Alpes d'Huez, Gavarnie, Lacanau, and Chamonix. In winter, aircraft are detached to Chamonix and Alpes d'Huez.

Water bomber group 

 Bombardier 415 (12)

France was the first nation to commit to the CL-415 "Superscoop" in 1992, so that it could phase out its Canadair CL-215s.

 Bombardier Dash 8 (6)

This aircraft is designated the Q400-MR (Multi Role). The aircraft can be reconfigured into the passenger, cargo or aerial fire control role in under three hours and can drop  in the tanker role. 6 more ordered in 2017 for 365M€, 4 delivered by the end of 2021.

 Beechcraft Super King Air 200 (3)

Bases 
All fixed-wing aircraft are based at Garons Provence Airport.

Bomb disposal 
307  bomb disposal experts are based at 20 bomb disposal units, including 2 overseas units (Guadeloupe and French Guiana). They are responsible for the detection, removal, disposal or destruction of suspicious objects. They also provide assistance during official travel or large demonstrations and de-arm and destroy unexploded ammunition still present from the two world wars.
 
In 2004,  of munitions was disposed of, whilst 43 bomb disposal experts were deployed on the 60th anniversary of the Normandy landings, 17 on the 60th anniversary of the landing in Provence and 16 during the visit of Pope John Paul II to Lourdes.

References

External links 

 - Sécurité Civile (in French)
 Sécurité Civile Helicopters (in French)
 Sécurité Civile Helicopters fleet

Civil defense
Emergency services in France
Government agencies of France